The Treaty of Bourges was an agreement between Henry IV, King of England and Charles, Duke of Orléans signed on 18 May 1412. In return for military aid against the Burgundians, the Armagnacs offered Henry IV full sovereignty in Gascony. Due to a temporary peace between the Armagnacs and Burgundians, the treaty was never fulfilled.

Context
In November 1407, Louis I, Duke of Orléans was assassinated, starting a civil war in France between the Armagnacs and the Burgundians. In consequence, both parties sought Henry IV's assistance for the war.

In 1411, Henry IV sent a small contingent to help John the Fearless, Duke of Burgundy. In 1412, the Armagnacs offered the restitution of Aquitaine in return for military aid.

Agreement
On May 18, 1412, the Armagnacs recognized the sovereignty of Henry IV in the Duchy of Aquitaine in return for an army of 4,000 men.

As part of the agreement, Thomas of Lancaster, Duke of Clarence, devastated western France south of the Loire. However, the terms of the agreement were never fulfilled due to a temporary peace between the Armagnacs and the Burgundians, also the death of Henry IV in 1413.

References

Treaties of France
Treaties of England
Hundred Years' War